Denmark is an unincorporated community in Bulloch County, in the U.S. state of Georgia.

Population: The population in 2022 was estimated at 278 people.

History
The community was named after a local family with the last name of Denmark.

References

Unincorporated communities in Bulloch County, Georgia